Born Vassos Alexander Georgiadis is a British sports reporter, presenter, author and endurance runner. He is currently the sports presenter of The Chris Evans Breakfast Show on Virgin Radio. Alexander hosts the Parkrun podcast, he is a motivational speaker and serves as an ambassador for the young person's charity SkillForce.

Broadcasting career
From 2011, Alexander was the sports presenter on The Chris Evans Breakfast Show on BBC Radio 2. However, in January 2019, Alexander along with Chris Evans, and several members of the BBC Radio 2 team moved to the Breakfast Show on Virgin Radio, where Alexander continues in his role as the sports reporter. During his time working with Evans, as well reporting sport, he has acted as a side kick presenter and shared his passion for running marathons with Evans, he has also authored books on the subject.

He has also worked on Radio 5 Live as a presenter, reported and commentated on BBC television, Channel 4, BT Sport and Eurosport. He has reported on six Olympic Games for BBC Sport and has commentated on tennis, golf, diving and darts.

Podcasts 
Since April 2018, Alexander has been the co-host of 'free weekly timed', a podcast on the global running phenomenon of Parkrun. Alexander is a Parkrunner and co-hosts the Free Weekly Timed podcast with Helen Williams.

Running
Alexander has completed some of the hardest ultra-marathons in the sport including the 153-mile Spartathalon and ironman triathlons. He has also run over 50 road marathons and has a sub-3-hour personal best.

Author
Alexander is the author of three best selling books:

 Don't Stop Me Now, 26.2 Tales of a Runner's Obsession. - a celebration of running in 26.2 chapters
 Running up that Hill, the highs and lows of going that bit further (published by Bloomsbury) which explores what lies beyond the marathon finish line
 How to run a marathon

Personal life
Alexander lives in Barnes, south-west London with his wife (Caroline) and three children (Matthew (16), Mary (8), and Emily (18)).

References

BBC radio presenters
British sports journalists
Darts commentators
Living people
British non-fiction writers
Year of birth missing (living people)
Place of birth missing (living people)